The Farmers State Bank, at 601 Main in Adams, Nebraska, was built in 1908.  It served as a bank  from 1908 to 1936 and then served as a post office.  It was listed on the National Register of Historic Places in 1992.

It was deemed significant architecturally "as a good example of a small town bank, a characteristic type in Nebraska", having "two  facades that displayed fine materials and dignified styling", and was judged to be the best surviving early 20th century commercial structure in Adams.

In 1992, the building was used as a dentist's office.

References

External links 
More photos of the Farmers State Bank at Wikimedia Commons

Bank buildings on the National Register of Historic Places in Nebraska
Renaissance Revival architecture in Nebraska
Commercial buildings completed in 1908
Buildings and structures in Gage County, Nebraska
Companies based in Nebraska
National Register of Historic Places in Gage County, Nebraska
1908 establishments in Nebraska